Deborah Sasson, whose real name is Deborah Ann O'Brien, is an American operatic soprano and musical theatre actress mostly active in Germany.

Life and career 
Sasson was born in Boston. As a teenager she sang in a high school band. After high school she studied classical singing at Oberlin College in Oberlin, Ohio and graduated with a "Master of Music". She had her first engagement at the Metropolitan Opera of New York. She made her debut on Broadway in Show Boat, whereupon in 1982 Leonard Bernstein cast her in the role of Maria in the Hamburg production of West Side Story.

Sasson was married to the opera singer Peter Hofmann from 1983 to 1990; her first husband was the conductor Michel Sasson. A duet version of Scarborough Fair with Hofmann can be found on her double platinum album Rock Classics (1982).

In 1988 Sasson developed a pop music concept with the producers Achim Völker and Horst Vay. Since then she has released numerous pop CDs. With (Carmen) Danger in Her Eyes and Passion and Pain, Sasson achieved two top 40 hits in Germany in 1989.

Sasson gives solo concerts with her own ensemble and performs in a duo programme with the opera singer Gunther Emmerlich.

Recordings 
 Das Phantom der Oper
 List of hits

References

External links 
 Deborah Sasson Home page
 
 

Living people
People from Boston
German musical theatre actresses
American operatic sopranos
American women pop singers
Year of birth missing (living people)
21st-century American women